The 1971–72 Bundesliga was the ninth season of the Bundesliga, West Germany's premier football league. It began on 14 August 1971 and ended on 28 June 1972. Borussia Mönchengladbach were the defending champions.

Competition modus
Every team played two games against each other team, one at home and one away. Teams received two points for a win and one point for a draw. If two or more teams were tied on points, places were determined by goal difference and, if still tied, by goals scored. The team with the most points were crowned champions while the two teams with the fewest points were relegated to their respective Regionalliga divisions.

Team changes to 1970–71
Kickers Offenbach and Rot-Weiss Essen were relegated to the Regionalliga after finishing in the last two places. They were replaced by VfL Bochum and Fortuna Düsseldorf, who won their respective promotion play-off groups.

Season overview

Team overview

League table

Results

Top goalscorers
40 goals
  Gerd Müller (FC Bayern Munich)

22 goals
  Klaus Fischer (FC Schalke 04)
  Hans Walitza (VfL Bochum)

20 goals
  Ferdinand Keller (Hannover 96)

19 goals
  Jupp Heynckes (Borussia Mönchengladbach)

18 goals
  Klaus Scheer (FC Schalke 04)

17 goals
  Günter Netzer (Borussia Mönchengladbach)

16 goals
  Bernd Rupp (1. FC Köln)

13 goals
  Uli Hoeneß (FC Bayern Munich)
  Idriz Hošić (1. FC Kaiserslautern)
  Bernd Nickel (Eintracht Frankfurt)
  Werner Weist (SV Werder Bremen)

Champion squad

See also
 1971–72 DFB-Pokal

References

External links
 DFB Bundesliga archive 1971/1972

Bundesliga seasons
1
Germany